The Detchana Puthumai tells us the situations of the South Land or Detchanam the center of Origin of Human Life according to Akilattirattu Ammanai the religious book of Ayyavazhi.

In Tamil, a South Indian ancient language, "Puthumai" means Miracle. It also means Newness. "Detchana" stands for "of the South"

Ayyavazhi mythology